Maam can refer to:

 ma'am, contraction for Madam
 Maam, also known as Maum, and An Mam in Irish, County Galway, Ireland
 Maam Valley, a glacial valley on the Maam Valley Fault, County Galway, Ireland
 MAAM, an acronym for the Mid-Atlantic Air Museum of Pennsylvania, US
 Maam Cross, County Galway, Ireland